Mayis Alishir oghlu Aghabeyov (b.1 May 1941; Baku, Azerbaijan SSR, Soviet Union - d. 17 June 2020; Baku, Azerbaijani Republic) was a Soviet and Azerbaijani artist and cinema production designer, People's Artist of Azerbaijan (2000).

Life 
Mayis Alishir oglu Agabayov was born on May 1, 1941, in Baku. In 1961, he graduated from the Azerbaijan State Art School. In 1969, after graduating from the All-Union State Institute of Cinematography in Moscow, he started working as a production designer at the "Azerbaijanfilm" film studio. Since 1965, he has participated in a number of international and republican exhibitions with his film and painting works. Since 1996, he has been teaching at the Azerbaijan State University of Culture and Artss. He was a professor of the Academic painting department at the Azerbaijan State Academy of Fine Arts. Mayis Aghabeyov died on June 17, 2020, at the age of 79 in Baku.

Creativity 
Aghabeyov was the production designer of such films, among them - "Nesimi", "Babek", "Try not to breathe" "Nizami", "Destroyed Bridges (film, 2004)", "Legend of the Silver Lake", "The Price of Happiness", " Country Walk”, “Life Tests Us”, “Execution Day” and others. He had worked in 27 films in total.

Awards 
 Honored Artist of the Republic of Azerbaijan (the first time) - March 4, 1992 
 Honored Artist of the Republic of Azerbaijan (the second time) - February 3, 1993
 People's Artist of Azerbaijan - December 18, 2000
 Humay Award - April 26, 2012

References 

Azerbaijani painters
2020 deaths
1941 births
Soviet painters
Artists from Baku